Marko Zaror Aguad (born June 10, 1978) is a Chilean martial artist and actor.

Early life
Zaror was born in Santiago, Chile and started training in martial arts when he was six years old. He has trained mainly in  taekwondo and kickboxing, and also  judo,  aikido, and  shotokan karate.

Career
Zaror has appeared in several Spanish language action films, including Chinango and Kiltro, and acted as stuntman for Dwayne "The Rock" Johnson in the 2003 film The Rundown. In 2010, he played bloodthirsty Colombian prisoner/fighter Raul "Dolor" Quinones in the film Undisputed III: Redemption, which was his first American film and the first time he spoke English in a film (he was previously only a stunt man). In Machete Kills (2013), he played an associate of main villain Luther Voz (Mel Gibson), with "Zaror" being his character's name; and was seen as a mixed martial arts competition finalist in the Bollywood movie Sultan. He has worked with Robert Rodríguez in several projects. Zaror is the only Latin American action film star devoted specifically to action films.

Personal life
Zaror lives in Los Angeles, California.
Zaror followed a ketogenic diet to improve his performance and later combined it with a vegetarian diet for ethical, environmental and health reasons. He  later adopted the carnivore diet.

Filmography

Film

Television

Music video

References

External links
 
 Official website

1978 births
Chilean emigrants to the United States
Chilean male film actors
Chilean people of Palestinian descent
Living people
Male actors from Santiago
Sportspeople from Santiago